Tadeusz Hogendorf (19 December 1918 – 12 June 2010) was a former Polish international footballer who played in midfield as well as being a forward.

Biography
Hogendorf was born in Rzeszów just after the conclusion of World War I when Poland became an independent state. Hogendorf started playing football with his local team Resovia Rzeszów, breaking into the first team in 1936. In 1937 Resovia were competing for promotion to the I liga, needing to beat Rewere Stanisławów in the final game to be promoted. Due to the club having no manager to organise the players, Hogendorf and Stanisław Baran went missing a few days before the game spending time with a local counts daughters instead of focusing on the game. Resovia ended up drawing the game 3–3 and failed to win promotion. In 1938 Hogendorf joined Warszawianka who played in the I liga. He managed 9 appearances for the top division side before the outbreak of World War II. 

During the war Hogendorf continued to play in a team made of Polish players. The teams would be transported around Poland and play teams composed of Nazi airmen or soldiers. Hogendorf claimed that the Germans wanted the Polish players to play for teams in Germany, but all the Polish players refused the offer.

After the war Hogendorf had brief spells with Pogoń Katowice and Baltia Gdańsk (who later became Lechia Gdańsk). While with Baltia Hogendorf was involved in the clubs first ever competitive game, and scored 7 goals in 7 appearances during his time at the club. Due to his successful spell with Lechia Hogendorf talked about the lengths ŁKS Łódź went to sign the best players of Lechia, stating that as the clubs officials were getting nervous the players wouldn't sign they took the players to a night club getting them drunk and taking them to Łódź. When the players woke up the next morning in Łódź they decided to sign for the club. At ŁKS Łódź Hogendorf had the longest spell of his career spending seven years with the club and making over 100 appearances. Although his the stats from his first two seasons are unknown, it is known that he scored 23 goals in 96 appearances for ŁKS in the I liga. Due to his performances for the club he is classed as an ŁKS Łódź legend. During his time with ŁKS Łódź he also caught the attention of the Poland national team management and was called up to play for his country. In total Hogendorf made 6 appearances for Poland and scored two goals, making his debut and scoring his debut goal in a match against Czechoslovakia. After his time with ŁKS he joined Gwardia Łódź before finishing his playing career back in his home town with Stal Rzeszów.

After his playing career Hogendorf focused on becoming a manager and coach. He previously held coaching roles with Włókniarz Łódź and Gwardia Łódź during his playing career and was the player manager of Stal Rzeszów in 1955. In 1958 Hogendorf graduated from the University of Physical Education in Warsaw and started managing Resovia Rzeszów in 1960. Hogendorf managed Stal Łańcut at some point during the 1961–62 season. He also managed Lechia Sędziszów Małopolski, his last job as a manager in football.

After leaving football Hogendorf went on to be physical education teacher in Rzeszów. In 1999 he was awarded the Officer's Cross of the Order of Polonia Restituta in 2001. In 2008 he became an Honorary Citizen of the City of Rzeszów. On 12 June 2010, aged 91, Hogendorf died in Rzeszów.

Awards

Main awards
1975: Gold Cross of Merit
1976: Gold Cross of Merit
1982: Knight's Cross Order of Polonia Restituta
1999: Officer's Cross Order of Polonia Restituta

Other awards
1948: Gold Badge from OZPN Łódź
1954: Gold Badge from Gwardia Łódź
1958: Gold Badge from Stal Rzeszów
1961: Gold Badge from Resovia Rzeszów
1963: Gold Badge from OZPN Rzeszów
1965: Gold Badge from ŁKS Łódź
1967: Badge of the 1000th Anniversary of People's Poland
1975: Badge of Meritorious Activist of Physical Culture
1976: Badge of Honor of the Polish Football Association
1980: Badge for Meritorious achievement for the City of Rzeszów
1983: Silver Badge of Physical Culture
1987: Medal of the 40th Anniversary of the People's Republic of Poland
1987: Badge of Meritorious achievement for ŁKS
1995: Badge of Achievement for OZPN Association in Rzeszów
1995: Honorary Badge of the OZPN Association in Przemyśl
1995: Medal of the 75th anniversary of the Polish Football Association
1997: Golden Badge of Physical Culture

References

1918 births
2010 deaths
Polish footballers
Poland international footballers
Lechia Gdańsk players
ŁKS Łódź players
Polish football managers
Ekstraklasa players
Association football midfielders
Association football forwards